Allocladius is a genus of flies belonging to the family Chironomidae.

The genus has almost cosmopolitan distribution.

Species:
 Allocladius fortispinatus
 Allocladius globosus

References

Chironomidae